General elections were held in the Turks and Caicos Islands on 24 April 2003. The result was initially a victory for the ruling People's Democratic Movement (PDM), which won seven of the thirteen seats in the Legislative Council, with PDM leader Derek Hugh Taylor remaining Chief Minister. However, a court order resulted in the results in South Caicos North (won by the PDM's Noel Skippings by two votes) and Five Cays Providenciales (won by the PDM's Sean Astwood by five votes) being annulled. The opposition PNP won both seats in the subsequent by-elections and subsequently formed a government in August with Michael Misick becoming Chief Minister.

Electoral system
The thirteen members of the Legislative Council were elected from single-member constituencies.

Campaign
A total of 26 candidates contested the elections, with both the PDM and the PNP running full slates of 13 candidates.

Results

References

Elections in the Turks and Caicos Islands
Turks
2003 in the Turks and Caicos Islands
Turks
April 2003 events in North America